Rafael Nadal defeated the defending champion Novak Djokovic in the final, 7–5, 1–6, 6–3 to win the men's singles tennis title at the 2021 Italian Open. It was his record-extending 10th Italian Open title and record-equaling 36th Masters 1000 title overall (matching Djokovic's tally). Nadal saved two match points en route to the title, in his third round match against Denis Shapovalov. This was also the fourth time that Nadal had won a tournament on 10 or more occasions, making him the only tennis player with the feat.

It was Djokovic's sixth runners-up finish at the Italian Open, a record for the most runner-up finishes at one event on the ATP Tour. This was a record he equalled later in the year at the US Open when he was attempting to win the calendar grand slam, after winning the Australian Open, French Open and Wimbledon. Daniil Medvedev beat Djokovic in the final for his sixth runners-up finish at the US Open.

Lorenzo Sonego became the first Italian man to reach a semifinal in Rome since Filippo Volandri in 2007.

Seeds
The top eight seeds received a bye into the second round.

Draw

Finals

Top half

Section 1

Section 2

Bottom half

Section 3

Section 4

Qualifying

Seeds

Qualifiers

Lucky losers

Qualifying draw

First qualifier

Second qualifier

Third qualifier

Fourth qualifier

Fifth qualifier

Sixth qualifier

Seventh qualifier

ATP singles main-draw entrants

Seeds
The following are the seeded players. Seedings are based on ATP rankings as of 3 May 2021. Rankings and points before are as of 10 May 2021.

Other entrants
The following players received wild cards into the main singles draw:
  Salvatore Caruso
  Gianluca Mager
  Lorenzo Musetti
  Stefano Travaglia

The following players received entry from the singles qualifying draw:
  Roberto Carballés Baena
  Alejandro Davidovich Fokina
  Federico Delbonis
  Hugo Dellien
  Kamil Majchrzak
  Cameron Norrie
  Tommy Paul

The following players received entry as lucky losers:
  Aljaž Bedene
  Yoshihito Nishioka

Withdrawals 
Before the tournament
  Borna Ćorić → replaced by  Miomir Kecmanović
  Roger Federer → replaced by  Reilly Opelka
  John Isner → replaced by  Laslo Đere
  Guido Pella → replaced by  Yoshihito Nishioka
  Casper Ruud → replaced by  Aljaž Bedene
  Stan Wawrinka → replaced by  Lloyd Harris

During the tournament
  Pablo Carreño Busta

Retirements 
  Hubert Hurkacz

References

External links
 Main draw
 Qualifying draw

Men's Singles